This is a list of states in the Holy Roman Empire beginning with the letter M:

References

M